Adeixis inostentata is a species of moth in the family Geometridae which was first described by Francis Walker in 1861. It is found in Australia.

References

Oenochrominae